Maxime Desjardins (1861–1936) was a French stage actor and film actor of the silent and early sound era.  He was a member of the Comédie-Française.

Selected filmography
 The Eaglet (1913)
 Patrie (1917)
 J'accuse (1919)
 Les Trois Mousquetaires (1921)
 The Mysteries of Paris (1922)
 The Agony of the Eagles (1922)
 Le bossu (1925)
 Simone (1926)
 Martyr (1927)
 La grande épreuve (1928)
 Atlantis (1930)
 The Mystery of the Yellow Room (1930)
 The Lacquered Box (1932)

References

Bibliography
 Edwards, Paul M. World War I on Film: English Language Releases through 2014. McFarland, 2016.
 Fleischer, Mary. Embodied Texts: Symbolist Playwright-dancer Collaborations. Rodopi, 2007.

External links

1861 births
1936 deaths
People from Auxerre
French male film actors
French male stage actors
French male silent film actors
20th-century French male actors